The Trade Union Act 1984 was a law in the United Kingdom that required all trade unions to hold a secret ballot before calling a strike. The majority of the act did not apply to trade unions based in Northern Ireland. The act was repealed on 16 October 1992. Sir Peter Bottomley, who is the current MP for Worthing West, reportedly said that the act was "designed to ensure that trade unions are more democratic and their leaders more accountable to their members."

The act also required unions to elect a new general secretary every five years and to validate funds every ten years.

Kenneth Clarke, who is a politician for the Conservative Party (UK) reported that, at a point approximately two years after the passing of the bill, 19 unions changed the practice to comply with the act. The act also says that those who are in high up positions in the union must "be accountable to the membership [of the union] as a whole."

Context
At the time the act was passed, the UK miner's strike had just started and, as a result, the government passed acts like this to limit the effect caused by strikes by this. Some people have said that the law was passed after the start of the Falkland's war due to the increase in popularity for the government brought on by the conflict.

Effect
The act limited the amount of industrial action by strengthening the requirements for a strike to be considered lawful. It also allowed the legality of the miners' strike to be questioned, as members of the National Union of Mineworkers were not given the chance to vote on this issue.

As a result of this act, striking miners were not entitled to state benefits, thus forcing the majority of miners and their families to survive the strike on handouts, donations from the European "food mountain" and other charities. Being without benefits had more serious consequences for the miners and their families. Their children were not entitled to free school meals or social security help with school uniforms. Poverty and hunger became rife in the mining heartlands. This forced many miners into a dilemma: return to work, and be viewed as a "scab"; or maintain support and live primarily on donations, which is what the majority did.

Notes

Part of the 'effect' section is copied from UK miners' strike (1984–1985)

References
Department of Employment, Democracy in Trade Unions (1983) Cm 8778
E McGaughey, 'Democracy or Oligarchy? Models of Union Governance in the UK, Germany and US' (2017) ssrn.com

United Kingdom Acts of Parliament 1984
United Kingdom labour law
British trade unions history
Trade union legislation
UK miners' strike (1984–1985)
1984 in labor relations